The Led Zeppelin bootleg recordings are a collection of audio and video recordings of musical performances by the English rock band Led Zeppelin which were never officially released by the band, or under other legal authority. The recordings consist of both live concert performances and outtakes from studio sessions conducted by the band. Many hundreds of Led Zeppelin bootlegs exist, and are widely collected by fans.

Overview
Led Zeppelin were, throughout the decade of the 1970s, one of the world's most frequently bootlegged performers, and to this day remain one of the most bootlegged artists in the history of rock music. In August 1999, the band topped the list of Britain's most bootlegged musicians with 384 bootleg titles, compiled by the Anti-Piracy Unit of British Phonographic Industry. This phenomenon was due partly to the popularity of the band, which has ensured a large and enthusiastic market for unauthorised recordings, and partly to the large size of the audiences who attended their performances, which made the effective detection of covert recording equipment at these concerts virtually impossible.

Led Zeppelin's manager, Peter Grant, sometimes took extraordinary measures to combat the practice of live bootleg recordings at Led Zeppelin concerts. He is reported to have personally visited record stores in London which were selling Led Zeppelin bootlegs and demanded all copies be handed over. He also monitored the crowd at Led Zeppelin concerts so as to locate anything which resembled bootleg recording equipment. At one concert at Vancouver in 1971 he saw what he thought was recording equipment on the floor of the venue and personally ensured that the equipment be destroyed, only to find out later that the equipment was a noise pollution unit being operated by city officials to test the volume of the concert. Similarly, at the Bath Festival in 1970, he personally threw a bucket of water over unauthorised recording equipment.

These efforts were not enough to prevent the release of a flood of Led Zeppelin bootlegs from the 1970s onwards. As is explained by Led Zeppelin archivist Dave Lewis:

Earliest bootlegs

During the 1970s, bootleg labels such as Smilin' Ear, Kornyfone, Dragonfly, Trade Mark of Quality, Condor and Toasted released unofficial recordings of several Led Zeppelin shows on vinyl. The following table includes a sample of these recordings. Most of them derived from audience tapes, though a few (such as Destroyer) were sourced from soundboard recordings.

The 1980s: the release of the soundboards

In the late 1980s, the number of available soundboard recordings of Led Zeppelin shows increased significantly as a result of original soundboard tapes being stolen during a burglary at the home of Led Zeppelin guitarist Jimmy Page and later copied for underground release. Also stolen were copies of several rare studio out-takes, which were released under titles such as Jennings Farm Blues (featuring run-throughs of an electric version of "Bron-Y-Aur Stomp" recorded in October 1969) and Studio Daze (including different studio mixes of "Since I've Been Loving You", "No Quarter" and "All My Love"). "Midnight Moonlight", a song later recorded by "The Firm", is also available through studio bootlegs.

The 1990s: the CD era
The 1990s saw a multitude of Led Zeppelin bootlegs become available on the CD format, with limited-edition and higher quality releases being produced in Japan on labels such as Tarantura and Antrabata. The most significant 90s label TDOLZ (The Diagrams of Led Zeppelin) has covered most of the circulating concerts for that period releasing over 100 titles. In 1999, the BBC reported that the number of Led Zeppelin bootleg titles in circulation exceeded those of The Beatles.

Some notable Led Zeppelin bootlegs released on CD include:
"Don't Mess with Texas" : Recorded at the Texas international Pop Festival in Dallas on August 31, 1969.
Burn Like A Candle : The complete show from the Los Angeles Forum on June 25, 1972.
Pigeon Blood : Recorded at Tampa Stadium, Florida on May 5, 1973.
Knebworth : Both of the band's performances at the Knebworth Festival in August 1979.

The 2000s and present: Empress Valley soundboard breakthrough
Numerous previously uncirculated complete high quality soundboard recordings were released by newly established Empress Valley label (also referenced as Empress Valley Supreme Disc or EVSD) which is the semi-successor of retired Tarantura. While Empress Valley surfaced many of the recordings, some, including "Working Tapes" were merely repackages of tapes fans had already surfaced and traded via the Internet. Also, early releases such as the "Physical Rocket" DVD were made from sub-par videotapes and were later far surpassed by versions surfaced by fans:

Since Empress Valley is the only supplier of new soundboard material for the moment, its issues are being cloned after initial release by numerous minor labels, sometimes with alternative titles. As noted above, however, Empress Valley has done its own share of repackaging already existent tapes.

Bootleg trading on the Web
In the 80s and 90s before broadband Internet access became widely available, bootlegs (CD-Rs or Compact Cassette copies) circulated mostly via the mail. Today, all of the unauthorised Led Zeppelin material is available on the Internet, mostly on BitTorrent resources in lossless media formats. Decoding and redistributing audio in lossy formats (such as MP3) is strongly frowned upon among the trading community as it diminishes the quality of the audio and can make it difficult for recipients to know if they are receiving the best available copy. During the 2000s, previously uncirculated audience recordings surfaced mostly on the BitTorrent resources.

Notable previously unheard audience recordings that surfaced on the Web from 2000's:
 Olympia Stadium, Detroit, US on August 28, 1970.
 Madison Square Garden, New York City, US on September 19, 1970.
 The Casino, Montreux, Switzerland on August 7, 1971.
 The Spectrum, Philadelphia, US on June 13, 1972.
 Chicago Stadium, Chicago, US on January 22, 1975.
 Riverfront Coliseum, Cincinnati, US on April 20, 1977.
 Freedom Hall, Louisville, US on April 25, 1977.
 École Centrale, Paris, France on December 6, 1969.

2007 court case
In July 2007 Page appeared in a Glasgow Sheriff courtroom to give testimony and observe evidence on behalf of Led Zeppelin against an alleged bootlegger. Robert Langley was charged with, and denied, 12 counts of producing and selling products without copyright permission.
 
Page was shown hundreds of CDs and DVDs, ranging from his solo material to his time with Led Zeppelin and the Yardbirds, which Langley was allegedly selling in Scotland during 2005. Many contain footage and audio from Page's personal collection, stolen from his home in the early 1980s. The goods were found on sale as far away as New York City, where shop-owners thought they were official. Page later said "If you have something like this that appears legitimate then it is just not right".

Following Page's testimony, Langley changed his plea and admitted guilt to three trademark and two copyright infringements. He was sentenced to 20 months in prison which, at the time, was believed to be the highest sentence handed out to a bootlegger in Scotland.

References

Sources
Dave Lewis and Simon Pallett (1997) Led Zeppelin: The Concert File, London: Omnibus Press. .
Robert Godwin (1994) The Illustrated Collectors Guide to Led Zeppelin Volume 1, Burlington: Collectors Guide Publishing. 
Robert Godwin (1997) The Illustrated Collectors Guide to Led Zeppelin Volume 2, Burlington: Collectors Guide Publishing. 
Luis Rey (1997) Led Zeppelin Live: An Illustrated Exploration of Underground Tapes, Ontario: The Hot Wacks Press. .

External links
The Year of Led Zeppelin A collection of in-depth reviews of every known live recording
Underground Uprising A comprehensive database of Led Zeppelin bootleg recordings
Bootlegpedia.com: Led Zeppelin The complete Led Zeppelin's Bootleg Encyclopedia
BootLedZ.Com another label database with title comparisons.
Ramble On Zep concert transcriptions.
Led Zeppelin Live (domain has expired)
Reviews List of Led Zeppelin bootleg reviews
Argenteum Astrum Comprehensive list of Led Zeppelin bootlegs, included vinyl, CD, and visual material
ZeppelinArt Comprehensive repository for artwork of unofficial Led Zeppelin releases/bootlegs